Free Touching: Live at Keep in Touch is a live recording of improvisational performances by Chinese guzheng virtuoso Wang Yong and six international musicians:  Dutch jazz drummer Han Bennink, Austrian violinist Andreas Schreiber, American guitarist Dennis Rea, American trumpeter Lesli Dalaba, and horn players Claudio Puntin and Steffen Schorn.  The jam session from which the album is drawn was recorded during the Beijing International Jazz Festival on November 12, 1996 at Keep In Touch, reportedly China's first internet cafe.

The recorded performances are a mixture of American style free jazz and European influenced improvisation blended at times with traditional Chinese music. On his website Dennis Rea states that Free Touching: Live in Beijing at Keep in Touch is "quite possibly the first recording of free improvisation to emerge from China."

The album was released as a double CD in March, 2004 on the Hong Kong-based Noise Asia Records label.  It is distributed in North America by Verge Music Distributing.

Track listing
Red Disc - 58:51
"Improvisation 1"
"Improvisation 2"
"Improvisation 3"
"Improvisation 4"
"Improvisation 5"
"Improvisation 6"

Pink Disc - 62:13
"Improvisation 7"
"Improvisation 8"
"Improvisation 9"
"Improvisation 10"
"Improvisation 11"

Personnel
Wang Yong - guzheng
Han Bennink - drums
Andreas Schreiber - violin
Dennis Rea - guitar
Steffen Schorn - horns
Claudio Puntin - horns
Lesli Dalaba - trumpet

Notes

Dennis Rea live albums
2004 live albums
Live free improvisation albums
Collaborative albums
Han Bennink live albums
Live instrumental albums